Simonson is an unincorporated community in Richmond County, in the U.S. state of Virginia.

Indian Banks was added to the National Register of Historic Places in 1980.

References

Unincorporated communities in Virginia
Unincorporated communities in Richmond County, Virginia